Emerson Drive is the third studio album by the Canadian country music band of the same name released on May 21, 2002 via DreamWorks Records Nashville. It produced three singles on the Billboard Hot Country Songs charts: the Top 5 hits "I Should Be Sleeping" and "Fall Into Me", as well as the number 23-peaking "Only God (Could Stop Me Loving You)". This latter song was originally recorded by Billy Ray Cyrus on his 1994 album Storm in the Heartland, and in 1999 by Lari White (as a duet with Toby Keith) on White's album Stepping Stone.

Track listing

Personnel
All instruments and vocals by Emerson Drive.
Pat Allingham – fiddle, acoustic guitar, electric guitar, mandolin, background vocals
Danick Dupelle – acoustic guitar, electric guitar, background vocals
Chris Hartman – piano, synthesizer, organ, acoustic guitar, background vocals
Jeff Loberg – bass guitar, background vocals
Brad Mates – lead vocals, acoustic guitar
Mike Melancon – drums, percussion, drum loops

All tracks produced by Julian King and James Stroud, except "Fall into Me" and "How Lucky I Am", produced by Richard Marx.

Charts

Weekly charts

Year-end charts

References

2002 debut albums
DreamWorks Records albums
Emerson Drive albums
Albums produced by James Stroud
Albums produced by Julian King (recording engineer)